is a fictional character of Bandai Namco's Tekken fighting game series, serving as its main antagonist. Introduced as the boss character from the first Tekken video game from 1994, Heihachi appears as the leader of a military firm known as the Mishima Zaibatsu. He was the protagonist of Tekken 2 and Tekken 7 whereas he was a boss character in two additional installments. He is opposed by many of his relatives who wish for his death out of revenge and to take over the Zaibatsu. This happens across the series and one of the creators of Tekken Katsuhiro Harada has called it a "family feud". Heihachi wants to defeat his son and grandson, Kazuya Mishima and Jin Kazama respectively. Heihachi's backstory and motives are revealed in Tekken 7, suggested to be his final appearance in the series.

Outside of Tekken spin-off titles, Heihachi also appears as a playable character in other games such as Soul Calibur II, PlayStation All-Stars Battle Royale, Street Fighter X Tekken, and the Project X Zone games. He is also featured in the printed, animated and live-action adaptations of the Tekken series. In contrast to the main Tekken games, Heihachi also appeared in many games with a younger appearance.

Harada referred to Heihachi as one of his favorite characters from the series. Critical reception to Heihachi has been positive with journalists praising his moves and characterization. However, critics joked about his design and expressed a lack of interest in his role in Tekken 7, where he is one of the most important characters. Nevertheless, his popularity has led him to become one of Namco's and Tekken'''s mascots.

Conception and creationTekken series director Katsuhiro Harada has stated that Heihachi is his favorite character in the series overall and the character he most frequently selects when playing. He further described Heihachi as a "very human character", stating that while focus has been placed on his appearance, he found the character's philosophy more interesting, and that in the series he was a "perfect portrayal of the evil that lurks in men's hearts", an evil "far more hideous than any made-up monster". In response to claims that the story of Tekken was complicated, Harada denied as he saw it as a "simple" struggle between members from the Mishima family. Despite promotion from Tekken 5 claiming that the character has died in the intro, Namco Bandai denied this statement in interviews. Heihachi's story and traits are based on Harada's history with his father. Harada was born in 1970, after World War II . However, Harada claims that in that period, parents were harsh with their children in Japan. As a result, Heihachi was portrayed as an antagonistic father to his son; something that the Japanese players could relate to. Heihachi's power in the form of the zaibatsu was based on the Imperialistic Japan. Furthermore, Heihachi is Tekkens personification of wartime Japan.

After Tekken 6, Heihachi's voice actor Daisuke Gōri passed away. In order to include the character once again in the spin-off Tekken Tag Tournament 2, Namco hired a new voice actor who would fit into the character. As for in this game, Heihachi took a potion to make himself look younger. The voice selected was Unshō Ishizuka. Tekken 7s story mode was supposed to conclude the long struggle between Kazuya and Heihachi. However, Namco made the story so that newcomers to the franchise would understand it more easily. In further teasers of the game, Harada stated that in Tekken 7 Kazuya or Heihachi would die in their final fight. In 2016, Harada commented he had his own family. As a result, he compared it with the violent characters from Tekken who are constantly fighting each other: Heihachi, Jin, and Kazuya. He viewed this type of family as "too hard" in comparison. When asked about the final fight between both Kazuya and Heihachi, Harada called it "a major milestone in the storyline", as he was surprised by how extended the rivalry between these two characters has become due to the franchise's current popularity, and thus felt it was necessary to end this in a mortal fight.

In Tekken 5, his movesets were viewed as one of the strongest from the cast but GameSpy commented that he lacked a weakness, as well as quicker attacks. In preparations for Tekken 7, Harada commented that he would often try Devil Jin if he was an "intermediate player", comparing his skills with Heihachi's. For Capcom's crossover game Street Fighter X Tekken, the official guide noted how Heihachi's multiple combos could inflict a large amount of damage on the opponents.

For the film Tekken: Blood Vengeance, writer Dai Satō commented that he had to wait to get Namco's approval to introduce Heihachi's final transformation using the power of the Mokujin in order to fight Jin in his Devil form. Heihachi's transformation surprised Harada and other members due to how over-the-top it was. The fight scene between the three generations of the Mishima family proved to be difficult to make as a result of the choreography aimed as well as the movement of motion actors. In order to use Heihachi in the movie, the original character Shin Kamiya was created. Shin's relationship with the Devil Gene experiments attract villain in the story.  In retrospect, Satō was shocked when learning Lars was Heihahchi's son, comparing it to Masami Kurumada's manga Saint Seiya which uses a similar plot twist involving a man like Heihachi, Mitsumasa Kido, having several offsprings secretely.

Comic book artist Cavan Scott described Heihachi and Kazuya as "demons" due to their dark character traits, making their rivalry with Jin look unfitting in the narrative because of their differences. Scott wanted fans to look forward to his Tekken comic adaptation due to his handling of the three main characters, as it's set during the time Jin becomes similar to Heihachi and Kazuya, making their war more engaging. While still treating Jin as the main character for not reaching Heihachi's traits in terms of corruption, he believed the two would, nevertheless, be interesting enemies.

Appearances
In video games
Main Tekken series
In the first Tekken game, Heihachi hosts the King of Iron Fist Tournament where he faces his son, Kazuya Mishima in the finals. Kazuya wins the tournament, tosses Heihachi off a cliff and assumes control of the Zaibatsu. Heihachi survives the fall, and then returns two years later in Tekken 2 to defeat his son. During the King of Iron Fist Tournament 2, Heihachi loses to Paul Phoenix in the semi-finals, however Heihachi replaces him when Paul was forced to forfeit after getting stuck in traffic as result of a multi-car collision on the expressway, and therefore unable to make the match on time, after defeating Kazuya in the finals, Heihachi tosses his body into a volcano, killing him. Fifteen years later, Heihachi learns of a creature, Ogre, which has immortal blood, Heihachi seeks his blood in order to create an "ultimate life form". Around this time, he meets a teenager named Jin Kazama, who claims to be his grandson and begs Heihachi to train him so he can take revenge against Ogre for murdering his mother Jun. Heihachi agrees, and four years later, announces the King of Iron Fist Tournament 3 to lure Ogre out. After Paul Phoenix defeats Ogre in the tournament, but then quits the competition under the impression that he has won, when he had one last opponent remaining in Ogre's true form after Ogre absorbs Heihachi's fighting force, after Heihachi tried to capture him while he was unconscious. Jin is reinstated in the tournament and replacing Paul in the finals, he manages to defeat True Ogre and completely dissolves, avenging his mother's death and winning the tournament as a result. Moments later, Jin is suddenly gunned down by a squadron of Tekken Force led by an awakened Heihachi, who no longer needing him, personally fires a final shot into his grandson's head. Jin, however, revived by the Devil within him, reawakens and dispatches the soldiers, smashing Heihachi through the wall of the temple as he survives.

During the events of Tekken 4 Heihachi collects the remains of Ogre and attempts to combine his and Ogre's DNA, but discovers that he will need the Devil Gene possessed by his son and grandson as a catalyst. Heihachi learns Kazuya has been resurrected. To lure both to him, Heihachi holds the fourth King of Iron Fist Tournament two years later. Heihachi defeats Kazuya in the finals, and takes him to Hon-Maru. However, the two are defeated by Jin, who escapes after sparing Heihachi's life. Following Jin's departure in Tekken 5, an army of G Corporation Jack-4s invade Hon-Maru. Heihachi is seemingly killed in the attack, but in reality was blown a great distance away after the Jacks detonated. However, he managed to survive and when he came to, the King of Iron Fist Tournament 5 was already over. He encountered Raven and they began to fight.

Before a winner could be decided, Raven received orders to return to headquarters, and he had to withdraw from battle.

After that encounter, Heihachi went home, without any knowledge of the events that occurred at the tournament, where he was ambushed by the Tekken Force. He appears in the story mode in the console version of Tekken 6, whose main character is Lars Alexandersson, Heihachi's illegitimate son. Heihachi tries to make an alliance with Lars but it fails.

Heihachi returns as the main character and arcade mode subboss in Tekken 7. The story follows most of his backstory. Heihachi is better known as the only son of Jinpachi Mishima, a famous martial artist who founded the Mishima Zaibatsu company. He later meets Kazumi Hachijo, who is much younger than him and sent by her family. Eventually, Heihachi and Kazumi become closer and get married, and Kazumi gives birth to their son, Kazuya. One evening, Kazumi attempts to kill Heihachi in cold blood and reveals that was the reason she married him. Her clan foresaw his attempt at world domination in the future and she was sent to assassinate him before that future comes to pass. However, Heihachi overpowers and, realizing the woman he loved is gone, kills her. In the same year, Heihachi overthrows his father for control of the Mishima Zaibatsu.

Following Jin's disappearance after his battle with Azazel, Heihachi single-handedly retakes the Mishima Zaibatsu and announces a seventh tournament to lure Kazuya out. At the same time, he is confronted by Akuma, whose life was once saved by Heihachi's deceased wife, Kazumi, and who promised to kill both Heihachi and Kazuya for her in return. Heihachi clashes with Akuma and loses, but survives. In order to save the Zaibatsu's image, Heihachi captures footage of Kazuya's battle with Akuma in his Devil form; Their fight is interrupted as Heihachi blasts the two using Dr. Abel's satellite, but both survive. Heihachi then confronts Kazuya at the site of a volcano and the two clash. After a long struggle, Heihachi is apparently finally killed; his body is subsequently thrown into a river of molten lava.

Other video games
In the spin off Tekken Tag Tournament, Heihachi appears as a playable character. By winning the game as him, Heihachi is seen meditating while remembering his fights against Kazuya and Jin. In Tekken Tag Tournament 2, Tekken 3D: Prime Edition, Tekken Revolution, PlayStation All-Stars Battle Royale, Project X Zone, and Project X Zone 2, Heihachi appears to have regressed back to his original appearance. Heihachi is seen with a full head of hair for the first time. According to his character profile on the Tekken Tag Tournament 2 website, this is because he drank a rejuvenation serum. In the ending of such game, Heihachi tries to drink a serum to become a Devil like Jin, Kazuya and Kazumi, but instead turns into a bear. Additionally, In the "Fight Lab" section of the game, Lee kidnaps the Mishima three fighters for Combot's final test of the machine.

Heihachi makes a brief appearance on the Tekken spin-off game Death by Degrees as an optional boss. He also makes an appearance as a playable guest character in the PlayStation 2 and HD Online versions of the fighting game Soulcalibur II, and as an unlockable narrator in Ridge Racer 6, one of the launch titles for Xbox 360. A Mii costume of Heihachi was added to Super Smash Bros. for Nintendo 3DS and Wii U through DLC., Heihachi Mishima was also briefly considered as a playable character in the same game: Super Smash Bros. for Nintendo 3DS and Wii U, but was decided against because the game's developer, Masahiro Sakurai, considered implementing Heihachi's movement in Super Smash Bros. to be difficult, this was mentioned in Sakurai's Thoughts About Making Video Games 2. In Super Smash Bros. Ultimate, the costume returns and he is also featured as a sprite in Pac-Man's Namco Roulette taunt. He later appears as a background character in the Mishima Dojo stage and as a Spirit.
Heihachi appears in a cameo in the Tekken Bowl App due to the pins being based on his face.
Heihachi is one of the bonus characters available to play as or against in Anna Kournikova's Smash Court Tennis for the PlayStation (alongside fellow Namco characters) and is an unlockable character in Smash Court Tennis Pro Tournament 2. He also makes guest appearances in the role-playing game Tales of the Abyss (as one of Anise's custom dolls) and in Pac-Man Fever (alongside several other Namco characters). In the crossover tactical RPG Namco × Capcom Heihachi appears as one of playable characters representing the Namco universe. He also appears in the crossover fighting game Street Fighter X Tekken with Kuma as his official tag partner. He also appears in SNK's mobile phone game The King of Fighters All Star. Heihachi also makes a cameo appearance with Kazuya in the PlayStation 5 game, Astro's Playroom. Heihachi appears as a playable character in Fist of the North Star Legends ReVIVE.

In other media

Heihachi appears as the main antagonist in the anime Tekken: The Motion Picture, voiced by Daisuke Gōri in the Japanese version and by John Paul Shepard in the English dub. In the beginning, Heihachi throws Kazuya off a cliff as a child, and sixteen years later, hosts the King of Iron Fist Tournament in order to lure Kazuya out in the hope that he will accept his destiny as his heir. In the climax, Heihachi battles Kazuya and initially takes the upper hand, but is ultimately defeated. Kazuya, however, spares his father's life, and Heihachi escapes the battleground in a jet.

He is also present in the 2009 film Tekken where Heihachi is portrayed by stuntman Cary-Hiroyuki Tagawa. Tagawa reprised his role in the prequel Tekken 2: Kazuya's Revenge.<ref name="Beyond Hollywood">{{cite web |url=http://www.beyondhollywood.com/kane-kosugi-battles-amnesia-and-assassins-in-tekken-2-kazuyas-revenge-trailer/ |title=Kane Kosugi Battles Amnesia and Assassins in Tekken 2: Kazuya's Revenge |publisher=Beyond Hollywood |date=13 August 2014 |access-date=30 August 2014 |url-status=dead |archive-url=https://web.archive.org/web/20140905090546/http://www.beyondhollywood.com/kane-kosugi-battles-amnesia-and-assassins-in-tekken-2-kazuyas-revenge-trailer/ |archive-date=5 September 2014}}</ref> He also appears as the main antagonist in the 2011 CGI animated film Tekken: Blood Vengeance, which is an alternate retelling of the events between Tekken 5 and Tekken 6. In it, he was supposedly killed by Kazuya four years ago, though in reality he is hiding and had conducted the M-cell experiment (taken from the Devil Gene) on a high school class to test immortality. However, all of the subjects died with the exception of Shin Kamiya, who managed to gain immortality as Heihachi desired. Heihachi is absent for most of the film until the climax, where he reveals that the experiment was just a ruse; he instead tries to take the Devil Gene from Kazuya and Jin, which gives its users increased power. After killing Shin, he fights Kazuya and Jin, awakening the Mokujin spirit for help, though he is ultimately defeated by Jin. He is also present in the novel Tekken: The Dark History of Mishima.

Tooru Fujisawa featured Heihachi as a cameo in his manga Great Teacher Onizuka, modeled after his younger appearance in Tekken. In it, he engages in an arm wrestling competition with protagonist Onizuka, shouting out controller inputs while the crowd shouts for him to "Do a combo!" Though Heihachi strains him for a moment, Onizuka defeats him, calling him "triangle head" as an insult. Heihachi cameos again in a later issue briefly, overseeing students as they clean graffiti from the school's walls. Heihachi also makes a cameo appearance in the Puchimas! Petit Petit Idolmaster ONA series.

In merchandise
In 2006, Namco released a Heihachi figurine as part of a Tekken 5 set based upon his promotional artwork for the game. While not posable, the PVC figure came with equipable clothing items modeled after those in the game. A "statue" of Heihachi modeled after his Tekken 5 attire also appears in the Namco-themed lounge available for Japanese PlayStation Home users. A Heihachi Mishima-Inspired "Sukajan Jacket" was also released.

Reception
Heihachi has been a popular character. In 1996, Japanese magazine Gamest magazine named Heihachi the 15th best character of the preceding year, and in December 1997 he placed 40th on their list of the best video game characters. Sites have noted him as one of the best Tekken fighters citing his recognizable strength despite his old age. In the official poll by Namco, Heihachi is currently ranked as the 24th most requested Tekken character to be playable in Tekken X Street Fighter, at 6.12% of votes. He was also recognized as one of the best bosses in gaming as well as Tekken characters by multiple websites.

Critics enjoyed his work in the Tekken narrative. Complex noted that what made the character stand out mostly within fighting games in general was to his history in Tekken. The same site enjoyed his narrative in Tekken 2, calling his ending as "the craziest moments in the Tekken series" as he throws Kazuya into a volcano. His portrayal as a villain also earned subject of praise due to his treatment to his relatives. GameSpot named him one of the top ten villains in video games at number three, describing him as one of the most interesting villains in fighting games and adding comments on his little changed design across the series. He was listed as the 78th "most dastardly ne'er-do-wells" villains on video game by GamesRadar. GamesRadar listed Heihachi as the 3rd "Top badass old folk", with comments focused on his role within the story. The same site also named him as the "3rd gaming's richest jerk", for having the "10th most impractical hairstyle in gaming" and as the "3rd gaming hero you didn't realize was dead the whole time".  Edge described him as "a legendary fighting game villain", and cited the impact of his supposed death in Tekken 5. WhatCulture named him as the "9th Most Memorable Video Game Boss of All Time", stating "Heihachi is one slippery fish, and despite constantly finding himself in situations where his extended family wants to kill him a thousand times over, always manages to come out on top. He's basically un-killable, and his Goju-Ryu moveset is the bomb."

Both Kotaku and Game Informer have labelled him as one of the worst parents in video game history because of how he treats his relatives Kazuya and Jin. Den of Geek ranked Heihachi as the 9th best fighting game character, adding "The grand dame of the Tekken series, Mr Mishima Senior is one of only a handful of characters to have appeared in each of the main entries in Namco's legendary brawler." His character design, however, has been the subject of criticism due to ridiculous it looks. His younger appearance in Tekken Tag Tournament 2 resulted in surprising reactions by critics who mainly pointed his hair.

What Culture ranked him as the 8th greatest character in fighting games, calling him "one of the most iconic and important characters in the Tekken series, and even hardcore fans may have lost track of how many times he has died and come back to life." PlayStation Universe included Heihachi and Kazuya among the top 5 rival pairs in Tekken Tag Tournament 2 based on the potential a team up the two can make. Heihachi has also been rivaled with Capcom's characters including M. Bison and Gen due to their portrayals as in the games.

Heihachi's role in the story of Tekken 7 was met with mixed responses. This was mainly due to how both he and his son are the center of the narrative and the resolution might not appeal to most players despite scenes within the game showing nostalgic value. The character's final fight in Tekken 7 has been noted to be one of the hardest for newcomers due to how much more powerful he is than Kazuya, his rival. However, Akuma was noted to be far more challenging than Heihachi's fight.

Journalists have also commented on Heihachi's role in other games and adaptations. GamesRadar also ranked Heihachi's guest appearance in Soul Calibur II as the "40th awesome character cameo". GamePro in their preview of Soul Calibur II's console ports called Heihachi's appearance in the series a landmark both as the second Tekken character to appear in the titles and as the first unarmed fighter in the series. On the other hand, Arcade Sushi named Heihachi for his appearance in Soul Calibur as one of the "worst fighting game guest stars". In a review of the first Tekken live-action film, DVD Talk had negative opinions on Kazuya and Heihachi's subplot regarding their rivalry. THEM Anime Reviews criticized poorly pronunciation of Heihachi's name in the anime film of the series. Anime News Network joked about how ridiculously evil Heihachi is seen in the film due to how he nearly kills Kazuya. The Fandom Post enjoyed Heihachi's fight against Kazuya in the Western comics while also noting that the comic gave him more honor than his son.

See also
List of Tekken characters

References

External links
 Heihachi's Soul Archive page 

Action film characters
Action film villains
Fictional businesspeople in video games
Fictional business executives
Fictional child abusers
Fictional commanders
Fictional Japanese people in video games
Fictional martial artists in video games
Fictional Gōjū-ryū practitioners
Fictional karateka
Fictional martial arts trainers
Fictional murdered people
Fictional murderers
Fictional warlords in video games
Male characters in video games
Male film villains
Male video game villains
Namco antagonists
Tekken characters
Fictional uxoricides
Video game bosses
Video game characters with superhuman strength
Video game characters who can move at superhuman speeds
Video game characters with electric or magnetic abilities
Video game characters introduced in 1994
Video game mascots